Simon Gaon (born 1943) is an American painter, Expressionist, and action painter. He is best known for his intense, tempestuous, action oriented paintings of the cityscape.  He was also a co-founder of the Street Painters, a group of eight New York City artists who painted directly from the city life they observed on the streets of America's largest city.

Early life and education

Born in 1943 in Manhattan, Gaon at an early age displayed creative talents. By age 14, he began painting while attending the Roosevelt School in Stamford, Connecticut. A key influence on him was painter Arthur Bressler (1927–1975) who was Gaon's teacher and mentor. Gaon graduated from the High School of Art and Design in New York City. In 1962, Gaon won the art studio award scholarship from the Art Students League which allowed him to study art on the European continent. In 1964, he studied in Academia 63 in Haarlem, the Netherlands, and furthered his European education with the Art Students League Merit Scholarship (1965) and the Edward G. McDowell traveling scholarship

He later stayed more than ten years in Europe, primarily in Paris, where his style evolved. The works of the Fauve painters - Derain, Vlaminck as well as Soutine, Kokoschka, Corinth, and especially Van Gogh have all strongly influenced his work.

Gaon's philosophy and style

In his work, Gaon is influenced more by his temperament than intellectualism. He prefers to take risks, and edit later, putting the living experience of painting at the forefront of his craft. As an action painter, he immerses himself physically in his art, using pigment, emotion, and poetry to reinvent nature in a personal way. He paints nature and the city with abandonment and freedom, harnessing the different layers of the subconscious to help form the painting. However, life in all its energy and contradiction remains his inspiration. Subjects of his art include the night, the stormy sea, and the frenetic, carnival-like neon-lit city.

Art

Gaon is most famous for his Time Square series, (1998) displaying the chaos and confusion of city. His depictions of the locale have been called dizzying, disorienting and even mind-boggling. His works manifest the vitality, wildness, diverseness, and hysterical quality of the urban setting, ever expanding to the point of explosion. Gaon's chaotic Time Square, helps him, as an artist, express the contradictory life forces that live within him.

Gaon also focuses on those who live on the urban periphery, the street people, immigrants, and prostitutes. His paintings go beyond the immediate perception of these subjects, to uncover the inherent contradictions both in his subjects psyche and social position, and in his own consciousness. His subjects display a noble and prophetic character, as if spiritually from a bygone era, yet awkwardly entrenched in a harsh contemporary reality.

Museums and collections

Museum of the City of New York, New York
New York Historical Society, New York
Yeshiva University Museum, New York
Hudson River Museum, New York
Art Students League, New York
White and Case, New York
West Valley Art Museum, Surprise, Arizona
France Loisirs, Paris, France
Millennium Hotel, New York
Carrot Capital, LLC, New York
Queen's College Museum

Exhibitions
2016

Andrea Tardini Gallery, Venice
Scuderie Aldobrandini, Rome

2008

Gallerie OPEN, Berlin, Germany
Gallerie Rose, Hamburg, Germany

2007

Berlin Capital Club, Berlin Germany

2006
Famira Gallery, Sylt Germany
Nabi Gallery

2005
Dankert, Box, Meier, Rechtsanwalte (Law Offices) Berlin, Germany
Peter Findlay Gallery, New York,
NYTon Warndorff Gallery, Haarlem, The Netherlands
Nabi Gallery, New York, NY
Gallery Rose, Hamburg, Germany
Famira Gallery, Sylt Germany

2004 
Jan Famira Gallery, Sylt, Germany
West Vallery Art

2003
West Valley Museum, Surprise, Arizona

2002
Ludvika Konsthall, Ludvika, Sweden

1999
Galleri Rubens, Smedjebacken, Sweden
Realismus Galerie, Kasel, Germany
Galerie Rose, Hamburg, Germany

1997
Galerie Peter Fischinger, Stuttgart, Germany

1995
Galerie Peter Fischinger, Stuttgart, German
Susan Conway Gallery, Washington, D.C.

1992
Frank Bustamante Gallery, New York, NY

1991
Galerie Le Chainon Manquant, Paris, France
Loisits Corporate Offices, Paris, France

1990
Galerie Peter Fischinger, Stuttgart, Germany
Galerie Rose, Hamburg, Germany

1989
The Exhibition Space, New York (sponsored by Ingber Gallery)

1988
Inngber Gallery, New York, NY

1986
Nicolas Roerich Museum, New York, NY

1974
Galerie des Ambassadeurs, Paris, France

1968
Art Students League, New York City

References

External links
http://andreatardinigallery.com/site/wp-content/uploads/2016/10/vtour_sgaon/index.html
Peter Findlay Gallery
Spanierman Gallery
https://web.archive.org/web/20110711063528/http://www.galerierose.com/katalog/Katalog_Gaon_web.pdf
http://www.nabiarts.com/06/gaon06.htm

1943 births
Living people
20th-century American painters
American male painters
21st-century American painters
Painters from New York City
People from Manhattan
20th-century American Jews
Bukharan Jews
High School of Art and Design alumni
21st-century American Jews
20th-century American male artists